The 1918 Nebraska gubernatorial election was held on November 5, 1918, and featured former Lieutenant Governor Samuel R. McKelvie, a Republican, defeating incumbent Democratic Governor, Keith Neville.

Democratic primary

Candidates
Charles W. Bryan, former Mayor of Lincoln
Keith Neville, incumbent Governor

Results

Prohibition primary

Candidates
Charles W. Bryan, former Mayor of Lincoln
Julian D. Graves, attorney

Results

Republican primary

Candidates
Walter Johnson
Samuel R. McKelvie, former Lieutenant Governor

Results

General election

Results

References

Gubernatorial
1918
Nebraska